Pierre Délèze (born August 25, 1958 in Nendaz, Valais) is a former Swiss middle distance runner who set a national record of 3:31.75 min when he won the 1500 m race at the meeting in Zurich in 1985, defeating the reigning Olympic champion Sebastian Coe. He also set a national record over the Mile in 3:50.38 min in Koblenz in 1982.

Délèze participated in the 1500 m final at the 1983 World Championships in Athletics in Helsinki in which he fninshed sixth. The race was won by Steve Cram. In the 1987 World Championships in Athletics in Rome he finished fourth over 5000 m; the gold was won by Saïd Aouita.

International competitions

References

sports-reference
Weltklasse Zürich 1985 1500m

1958 births
Living people
Sportspeople from Valais
Swiss male middle-distance runners
Olympic athletes of Switzerland
Athletes (track and field) at the 1980 Summer Olympics
Athletes (track and field) at the 1984 Summer Olympics
Athletes (track and field) at the 1988 Summer Olympics
World Athletics Championships athletes for Switzerland
Universiade medalists in athletics (track and field)
Universiade silver medalists for Switzerland
Medalists at the 1979 Summer Universiade